Lic. Javier Ostos Mora (born August 15, 1916, in Mexico City, Mexico; died November 5, 2008) was a former lawyer and sport politician from Mexico, most widely known for his work within the swimming community.

He was a permanent member of the Mexican Olympic Committee (Comité Olímpico Mexicano—COM), from 1941 through to his death; and served at various times as voice, first vice president and second vice president of COM.

He twice served as president of FINA, the International Swimming Federation: from 1968 to 1972 and 1976–1980; and in 1992 he was named FINA honorary life president. His presidency with FINA made him the first Mexican president of any international sport federation.

Positions held
He was president of:
FINA: 1968-'72, 1976-'80;
the Amateur Swimming Union of the Americas (ASUA): 1968;
CCCAN: 1955-'70, 1974-'78;
the Mexican Swimming Federation (FMN: la Federación Mexicana de Natación): 1941, 1949-'51, 1955-'68, 1978-'80;

Honorary life member of: FINA, ASUA, and FMN.

Official/judge at the Summer Olympics in: London (1948), Rome (1960), Tokyo (1964), Mexico City (1968), Munich (1972), Montreal (1976), Moscow (1980), Los Angeles (1984), Seoul (1988), Barcelona (1992) and Atlanta (1996).

References

1916 births
Sportspeople from Mexico City
Swimming in Mexico
Presidents of FINA
2008 deaths